Engal Kural is a 1985 Indian Tamil-language film, directed by Rama Narayanan and produced by S. S. Chandran. The film stars Arjun, Suresh, Nalini and Jeevitha.

Cast

Arjun
Suresh
Jaishankar in guest appearance as Suresh, Arjun and Jeevitha Father of all 3
Nalini
Jeevitha
Radha Ravi
Sangili Murugan
Vennira Aadai Moorthy
S. S. Chandran
Kallapetti Singaram
Krishnamurthy
Jagadeesan
Anuradha
Vadivukkarasi
Gandhimathi
C. K. Saraswathi
Pasi Sathya
Vani
Kovai Sarala
Pasi Narayanan
Vijayakanth in guest appearance
V. K. Ramasamy  in guest appearance
Ambika in guest appearance
Jayachitra in guest appearance
Chandrasekhar in guest appearance

Soundtrack
Soundtrack was composed by T. Rajender.
"Sugam Sugam" - S. Janaki
"Oorapaatha" - Malaysia Vasudevan, Jayachandran
"Adi Vaadi Maane" - S. P. Balasubrahmanyam, Sasirekha
"Daagam Konda" - Sasirekha
"Mudhal Iravu" - S. P. Balasubrahmanyam, S. Janaki
"Maane Engedi" - Malaysia Vasudevan

References

External links
 

1985 films
1980s Tamil-language films
Films directed by Rama Narayanan
Films scored by T. Rajendar